Dobje can refer to each of following places in Slovenia:

 Dobje pri Lesičnem, Municipality of Šentjur pri Celju
 Dobje pri Planini, Municipality of Dobje
 Dobje, Gorenja Vas–Poljane, Municipality of Gorenja Vas–Poljane
 Dobje, Grosuplje, Municipality of Grosuplje
 Dobje, Litija, Municipality of Litija
 Municipality of Dobje